Osedax mucofloris is a species of bathypelagic Polychaetes that is reported to sustain itself on the bones of dead whales. Translated from the mixed Greek and Latin used in scientific names, "Osedax mucofloris" literally means "snot-flower bone-eater", though the less-accurate "bone-eating snot-flower worm" seems to be the form actually used. The species is found in North East Atlantic where it is abundant.

References

Sabellida